The Lotus 12 was a Formula Two and Formula One racing car.

Design
Colin Chapman's first foray into single-seater racing, the 12 appeared in 1957. It featured a number of important innovations Chapman would use on later models. To better use the power of the Coventry Climax engine, it was designed, as usual, for low weight and low drag, relying on a space frame. It placed the driver as low as possible, reducing the height of transmission tunnel by way of a "conceptually brilliant" five-speed sequential-shift transaxle located in the back. This transaxle was designed by Richard Ansdale and Harry Mundy. The gearbox had a (long-undiagnosed) oil starvation problem, thus earned the nickname "Queerbox" for its unreliability.

Although the first two examples of Lotus 12 had De Dion rear suspension, it also introduced a new suspension configuration with what came to be called "Chapman struts" in the rear, essentially a MacPherson strut with a fixed length halfshaft with universal joints on the ends utilised as a suspension arm.

Lotus 12 was the first Lotus to be fitted with the iconic wobbly-web wheels. Reflecting Chapman's emphasis on engineering for lightness, these were cast in magnesium alloy, a kind of crimped cylinder, resulting in minimum material and maximum strength, without the weaknesses induced by slots in conventional designs.

Despite its engineering advances, the 12 was not a success in F1. In F2, the car won the class in the mixed F1/F2 1958 BRDC International Trophy, driven by Cliff Allison, but in spite of a small number of podiums, was usually drowned in a sea of Coopers.

Gallery

Complete Formula One World Championship results
(key) (Results in bold indicate pole position; results in italics indicate fastest lap.) 

 All points scored using the Lotus 16.
* F2 driver

Notes

Sources
Setright, L. J. K. Lotus: The golden mean, in Northey, Tom (ed.) World of Automobiles (London: Orbis, 1974), Volume 11, pp. 1221–34.

Formula Two cars
12